Gliese 908 is a red dwarf star, located in constellation Pisces at 19.3 light-years from Earth.  It is a BY Draconis variable star with a variable star designation of BR Piscium.  Its apparent magnitude varies between magnitude 8.93 and magnitude 9.03 as a result of starspots and varying chromospheric activity.

The variability of Gliese 908 was confirmed in 1994, although no period could be detected in its brightness changes.  It was entered into the General Catalogue of Variable Stars in 1997.

Gliese 908 is a cool main sequence star, a red dwarf, with a spectral class of M1V Fe-1.  The suffix indicates a noticeable deficiency in heavy elements.

References

Pisces (constellation)
M-type main-sequence stars
0908
Pisces, BR
117473
J23491255+0224037
BD+01 4774